The Genesis Invitational is a professional golf tournament on the PGA Tour in southern California, first played  in 1926 as the Los Angeles Open.  Other previous names include Genesis Open, Northern Trust Open and Nissan Open. Played annually in February at the Riviera Country Club in Pacific Palisades, it is often the concluding event of the tour's "West Coast Swing" early in the calendar year, before the tour moves east to Florida.

The tournament has been held at Riviera on a near-continuous basis since 1973. South Korea-based Hyundai Motor Group, through its Genesis Motors subsidiary, took over sponsorship in 2017, after nine seasons from  Northern Trust Corporation, based in Chicago, following a 21-year sponsorship by Nissan Motors. Entertainer Glen Campbell was the celebrity host of the Los Angeles Open from 1971 through 1983.

Tournament sites
Listed by most recent

Not held in 1943
^ one round of the first two was played on the adjacent Harding course

History

Prior to World War II, the event led a nomadic existence in southern California, moving from course to course. The inaugural event  in 1926 was played at Los Angeles Country Club in Los Angeles; in 1927 the event moved to El Caballero Country Club in Tarzana for the only time. In 1928, the event moved again to Wilshire Country Club in the Hancock Park neighborhood, and 1929 and 1930 saw the event's first foray to the Riviera Country Club in Pacific Palisades before returning again to Los Angeles for the next decade. From 1931–1933, the event alternated between Wilshire CC and Hillcrest Country Club, before returning to Los Angeles CC from  From  the event was played at Griffith Park (Wilson course) and again at Los Angeles CC  Babe Zaharias played in the  being the first woman to play in a professional golf tournament for men.

In 1941, the event returned to Riviera CC and in 1942 was played again at Hillcrest CC before World War II intervened.

The event started up again in 1944 at Wilshire CC before spending the next nine years  at Riviera CC, which also hosted the U.S. Open in June 1948, won by Ben Hogan in a record score. In 1954, the event was played at Fox Hills Country Club (now in Culver City) and in 1955 moved to Inglewood Country Club. From  the event returned to Los Angeles at Rancho Park Golf Course, with the exception of 1968, which was at Brookside Golf Course in Pasadena, adjacent  to the Rose Bowl. In early January 1962, 21-year-old Jack Nicklaus made his professional debut at the Los Angeles Open – his 289 tied for 50th (last place after the cut) and earned $33.33 in prize money.

The L.A. Open was traditionally the first event of the season, played in early January; it was a late January event in 1967 and 1968, and moved to the latter half of February in 1974. The year before, it began its current relationship with Riviera CC. The tournament has only twice been played at other courses since: Rancho Park Golf Course in 1983, while Riviera prepared to host the PGA Championship, and Valencia Country Club in 1998, while Riviera prepared to host the U.S. Senior Open. The event remained at Riviera in 1995, despite Riviera hosting the PGA Championship that  and also remained in 2017, when the course hosted the U.S. Amateur.

He had earned his first paycheck as a pro in the event in 1962 at Rancho Park, less than thirty four dollars.

The 2001 event was only the second time that a six-player playoff was needed in PGA Tour history to determine the tournament winner. Robert Allenby won the playoff ahead of Toshi Izawa, Brandel Chamblee, Bob Tway, Jeff Sluman, and Dennis Paulson.

In 2005, the tournament was shortened by 36 holes due to rain. Adam Scott defeated Chad Campbell on the first hole of a sudden-death playoff on a Monday. Due to the event's length, this win is counted as unofficial for Scott.

In 2007, Rich Beem made a hole-in-one at the 14th hole on Saturday to win a new red Altima coupe, which he immediately ascended, embraced, and sat atop of in triumph.  The sequence was later made into a Nissan commercial. (video) Beem credited Peter Jacobsen for inspiring his reaction; Jacobsen aced the same hole thirteen years earlier in 1994 then hopped into the nearby 300ZX convertible and pretended to drive it.

In September 2007, it was originally announced that Bearing Point, a consulting firm based in McLean, Virginia, would become the new title sponsor of the tournament, but Northern Trust became the title sponsor beginning in February 2008. The five-year agreement, which extended through the 2012 event, was announced October 15, 2007, by PGA Tour Commissioner Tim Finchem and William A. Osborn, Chairman and CEO of Northern Trust Corporation. The tournament became known as the Northern Trust Open, and the new partnership marks the beginning of a process of transformation for this high-profile tournament. As part of the initial move to enhance the tournament, the Northern Trust Open increased its purse to $6.2 million in 2008, an increase of $1 million over 2007. Additionally, the tournament pro-am went from four amateurs to three per group. After the initial 5-year agreement, it was extended 4 years to cover Northern Trust's partnership through the 2016 event.

Phil Mickelson won the 2008 tournament and successfully defended the title in 2009 with a one-stroke victory over Steve Stricker. In 2010, Stricker came back to win the Northern Trust Open and secure his ranking of the number two player in the world. In 2016, Bubba Watson won the tournament for a second time in three years, holding off Adam Scott and Jason Kokrak to win by one shot with a 15-under-par total.

Following the demise of The National tournament after 2018, which was run by the Tiger Woods Foundation, the Genesis Open was converted to an invitational for 2020, with a larger purse and a smaller field.

Invitational status
The Genesis Invitational is one of only five tournaments given "invitational" status by the PGA Tour, and consequently it has a reduced field of only 120 players (as opposed to most full-field open tournaments with a field of 156 players). The other four are the Arnold Palmer Invitational, RBC Heritage, Charles Schwab Challenge, and the Memorial Tournament.

Invitational tournaments have smaller fields (between 120 and 132 players), and have more freedom than full-field open tournaments in determining which players are eligible to participate in their event, as invitational tournaments are not required to fill their fields using the PGA Tour Priority Ranking System. Furthermore, unlike full-field open tournaments, invitational tournaments do not offer open qualifying (aka Monday qualifying). The winner is granted a three-year tour exemption, rather than two.

Field
The field consists of at least 120 players invited using the following criteria:
 Genesis winners from past five years
 The Players Championship and major championship winners in the last five years
 FedEx Cup winners in the last five years (beginning with the 2019 winner)
 World Golf Championships winners in the past three years
 Arnold Palmer Invitational and Memorial Tournament winners in the past three years
 Tournament winner since last Genesis
 Prior year U.S. Amateur winner (may have turned professional)
 Current PGA Tour members who were playing members of last named Ryder Cup and Presidents Cup teams
 Top 125 from prior year FedEx Cup points list
 Top 10 from the current FedEx Cup points list (as of Friday prior)
 12 sponsor exemptions – 2 from Web.com Tour finals, 2 members not otherwise exempt, and 8 unrestricted
 If necessary, field filled to 120 from current year FedEx Cup point list (as of Friday prior)

Charlie Sifford Memorial Exemption
In 2009, the tournament designated one unrestricted exemption for a player who represents the advancement of diversity in golf. The exemption is called the Charlie Sifford Memorial Exemption, in honor of pioneering black golfer and 1969 tournament winner Charlie Sifford. While most of the recipients have been of African-American descent, the 2015 exemption went to PGA Tour rookie Carlos Sainz Jr., of Filipino and Bolivian descent; and the 2016 recipient, J. J. Spaun, is also of Filipino descent.

The 2018 exemption went to Cameron Champ, who nine months later became the first past recipient of this exemption to win on the PGA Tour when he won the Sanderson Farms Championship in the fall portion of the 2019 season. In 2020, Joseph Bramlett became the first two-time recipient of the award.

{| class="wikitable" 
!Year
!Player
!Result
|-
| 2009
| Vincent Johnson 
| align=center|CUT
|-
| 2010
| Joshua Wooding
| align=center|CUT
|-
| 2011
| Joseph Bramlett
| align=center|CUT
|-
| 2012
| Andy Walker
| align=center|CUT
|-
| 2013
| Jeremiah Wooding
| align=center|T42
|-
| 2014
| Harold Varner III
| align=center|T70
|-
| 2015 
| Carlos Sainz Jr.
| align=center|CUT
|-
| 2016
| J. J. Spaun
| align=center|CUT
|-
| 2017
| Kevin Hall
| align=center|CUT
|-
| 2018
| Cameron Champ
| align=center|CUT
|-
| 2019
| Timothy O'Neal
| align=center|CUT
|-
| 2020
| Joseph Bramlett (2)
| align=center|T51
|-
| 2021
| Willie Mack III
| align=center|CUT
|-
| 2022
| Aaron Beverly
| align=center|CUT
|}

Course layout

Source:

Winners

Note: Green highlight indicates scoring records.
Sources:

Multiple winners
Seventeen men have officially won this tournament more than once through 2021.

4 wins
Macdonald Smith: 1928, 1929, 1932, 1934
Lloyd Mangrum: 1949, 1951, 1953, 1956
3 wins
Ben Hogan: 1942, 1947, 1948 - (Hogan also won the 1948 U.S. Open, played at Riviera)
Arnold Palmer: 1963, 1966, 1967
Bubba Watson: 2014, 2016, 2018
2 wins
Harry Cooper: 1926, 1937
Sam Snead: 1945, 1950
Paul Harney: 1964, 1965
Billy Casper: 1968, 1970
Tom Watson: 1980, 1982
Gil Morgan: 1978, 1983
Lanny Wadkins: 1979, 1985
Fred Couples: 1990, 1992
Corey Pavin: 1994, 1995
Mike Weir: 2003, 2004
Phil Mickelson: 2008, 2009
Adam Scott: 2005, 2020

Notes

References

External links

Coverage on the PGA Tour's official site

PGA Tour events
Golf in Los Angeles
Sports competitions in Los Angeles